Bothrocophias lojanus, also known commonly as the Lojan lancehead in English, and macanchi or macaucho in Spanish, is a species of venomous pit viper in the subfamily Crotalinae of the family Viperidae. The species is native to northwestern South America.

Geographic range
B. lojanus is found in Ecuador and Peru.

Habitat

Diet
B. lojanus preys upon lizards and small rodents.

Reproduction
B. lojanus is viviparous.

References

Further reading
Carrasco PA, Venegas PJ, Valencia JH (2016). "First confirmed records of the endangered Andean pitviper Bothrops lojanus Parker, 1930 (Viperidae: Crotalinae) from Peru". Herpetology Notes 9: 297–301.
Hamdan B, Guedes TB, Carrasco PA, Melville J (2019). "A complex biogeographic history of diversification in Neotropical lancehead pitvipers (Serpentes, Viperidae)". Zoologica Scripta 49 (2): 145–158. (Bothrocophias lojanus, new combination).
Parker HW (1930). "Two new Reptiles from Southern Ecuador". Annals and Magazine of Natural History, Tenth Series 5: 568–571. (Bothrops lojana, new species, p. 568)

External links
Arteaga A (2020). "Lojan Lancehead (Bothrops lojanus)". Reptiles of Ecuador. http://www.reptilesofecuador.com/bothrops_lojanus.html.

Reptiles described in 1930
lojanus
Taxobox binomials not recognized by IUCN